"Sólo por Ti" is a song by Colombian-American latin pop singer-songwriter Soraya. The song was released as the second single from her fourth studio album Soraya (2003). The song was written, recorded and produced by Soraya. An English-language version called "All for You" was released on the English/international edition of the album.

Track listing

Chart performance

References

2003 singles
2003 songs
Capitol Latin singles
Songs written by Soraya (musician)
Soraya (musician) songs